Skiftinge is an urban area situated in Eskilstuna Municipality, Södermanland County, Sweden with 5,104 inhabitants as of 2018.
A suburb, the area is located 3 kilometers north of central Eskilstuna and was officially part of the city proper until 2015.

History 
Old ceramics and jewelry dating back to the 11th century have been found in graves in the Skiftinge area, making archeologists believe that Skiftinge was a trading hub during the Viking Age.

References 

Södermanland
Eskilstuna